Inferuncus pentheres is a moth of the family Pterophoridae that is known from the Democratic Republic of Congo and Tanzania.

References

Platyptiliini
Moths described in 1969
Insects of Africa
Insects of Tanzania
Insects of the Democratic Republic of the Congo
Moths of Africa